Erim or ERIM may refer to:

 Environmental Research Institute of Michigan, an organization in the United States that develops remote sensing technology
 Erasmus Research Institute of Management, the joint research institute of the Rotterdam School of Management and the Erasmus School of Economics, both at Erasmus University Rotterdam
 ERIM (army Sumerogram), the capital letter-(majuscule) sumerogram for the Akkadian language word army, or "troops"

People 

 Kenan Erim (1929–1990), Turkish archaeologist
 Kerim Erim (1894–1952), Turkish mathematician
 Nihat Erim (1912–1980), Turkish politician

Places 
 Erim, Posof, a village in the district of Posof, Ardahan Province, Turkey

Turkish-language surnames